Colin James Beacom (born 1937), is a male former international badminton player who competed for England.

Badminton career
Beacom is a three times National champion, winning the English National Badminton Championships in the mixed doubles in 1964 with Jenny Pritchard and the men's doubles with Tony Jordan in 1966 and 1968. In addition he has won the 1963 Irish Open, 1964 Scottish Open in the doubles and 1973 Scottish Open singles.

He represented England in the singles, doubles and mixed, at the 1966 British Empire and Commonwealth Games in Kingston, Jamaica.

References

English male badminton players
1937 births
Living people
Badminton players at the 1966 British Empire and Commonwealth Games
Commonwealth Games competitors for England